Alexey Krutikov, also transliterated Aleksei Krutikov, Aleksey Krutikov, or Alexei Krutikov, may refer to:

 Alexey Dmitriyevich Krutikov (1902 - 1962), Soviet politician
 Alexey Nikolayevich Krutikov (1895 - 1949), Soviet general